Ellen Gerstell (born October 16, 1954) is an American voice actress. She is most known for providing the voice of Rapture in Jem and Mihoshi Kuramitsu in the Tenchi Muyo! franchise. She is the wife of the late Emmy Award-winning writer Gordon Bressack and mother of film producer James Cullen Bressack.

Early life and education 
She is Jewish. She was a contestant on the $100,000 Pyramid in January 1986, where she won over $16,000 in cash and prizes.

Voice roles
Aaahh!!! Real Monsters - Twarp
Blondie and Dagwood - Cookie Bumstead
Captain Simian & the Space Monkeys - Dr. Kelb
Darkwing Duck - Ample Grime
Dragon's Lair - Princess Daphne
Jem - Rapture/Phoebe Ashe, Astral
Little Clowns of Happytown - Tickles
Little Nemo: Adventures in Slumberland - Page
Magical Girl Pretty Sammy - Mihoshi Mizutani, Yuka, Chihiro Kawai (ep. 1)
Mighty Max - Flight Attendant, Sarah
Monchhichis - Tootoo
My Little Pony 'n Friends - Locket, Lofty, Scoops
My Little Pony: The Movie - Magic Star
Poochie - Poochie
Rude Dog & the Dweebs - Ditzy Kibble, Gloria; Additional Voices
TaleSpin - Katie Dodd
Tenchi Muyo! - Mihoshi Kuramitsu (OVAs 1-2), (Tenchi Universe), (Tenchi Muyo! Mihoshi Special), (Tenchi Muyo in Love), (Magical Girl Pretty Sammy (OVA 1))

References

External links
Ellen Gerstell at Voice Chasers

1954 births
Living people
American voice actresses
American video game actresses
University of Arizona alumni
Place of birth missing (living people)
20th-century American actresses
21st-century American actresses